The Celtic Book of Days is an album by David Arkenstone, released in 1998. It is the first of two Celtic albums by Arkenstone, the other being Spirit of Ireland.

Track listing
"Equos Fair" – 4:27
"Heart of Spring" – 4:47
"Stormcry" – 4:40
"Road to the Faire" – 5:28
"Light of the Water" – 4:36
"In the Ancient Time" – 3:35
"The Festival" – 5:06
"Yearning Hearts" – 4:22
"Behind Walls of Stone" – 5:20
"The Boats" – 5:04
"Cailleach's Whisper" – 3:34
"Children of the Sun" – 3:11
"The Turning of the Year" – 4:52
"The Dragon's Breath" – 3:29
"The Quest of Culhwch" – 4:54
 All tracks composed by David Arkenstone

Personnel
 David Arkenstone – guitars, mandolin, pennywhistle, cittern, bass, keyboards, piano, melodica, bodhran, percussion, vocals, sound design
 Don Markese – flute, alto flute, bass flute, pennywhistle, piccolo, clarinet, soprano sax
 Eric Rigler – Uilleann pipes
 Sid Page, Joel Derouin – solo violins
 Danny Chase – drums, percussion
 Lisa Lynne – Celtic harp
 Frank Marocco – accordion
 John Clarke – oboe
 Dave Riddles – bassoon
 Chris Strand – voices
 Diane Arkenstone – xylophone on "In the Ancient Time" & "Children of the Sun", synthesizers on "Light of the Water", "In the Ancient Time", "Behind Walls of Stone" & "Children of the Sun"
 Fred Arkenstone – Arkenstrings
 Northern Voices – choir

References

1998 albums
Windham Hill Records albums